Lark Hill is a rural locality in the Somerset Region, Queensland, Australia.

History 
Mount Stradbrook Provisional School opened on 8 July 1907. In June 1908, it was renamed Lark Hill Provisional School. On 1 January 1909, it became Lark Hill State School. It closed on 28 July 1967.

References

Suburbs of Somerset Region
Localities in Queensland